The pound was the currency of Georgia until 1793. Initially, sterling coin circulated. This was supplemented from 1735 with local paper money denominated in £sd, with 1 pound = 20 shillings = 240 pence.

The State of Georgia issued Continental currency denominated in £sd and Spanish dollars, at 1 dollar = 5 shillings. The continental currency was replaced by the U.S. dollar at the rate of 1000 continental dollars = 1 U.S. dollar.

See also

History of Georgia (U.S. state)
Province of Georgia

Historical currencies of the United States
1793 disestablishments in the United States
Pre-statehood history of Georgia (U.S. state)
Economy of Georgia (U.S. state)